The America's Great Outdoors Initiative (AGO) is a program of the Obama Administration, announced on . It is designed to preserve a number of notable natural features in the American landscape. It is also designed to protect key natural resources and natural features for future generations to enjoy. It is managed by the Bureau of Land Management, an agency within the Department of the Interior.

Purpose
The presidential memorandum calls for support from "private industry, local communities, Native American leaders and volunteers", while the text of the memorandum of the text itself  specifies coordination with the following federal agencies.

 United States Department of Defense
 United States Department of Commerce
 United States Department of Housing and Urban Development
 United States Department of Health and Human Services
 United States Department of Labor
 United States Department of Transportation
 United States Department of Education
 Office of Management and Budget

The initiative is not funded, with the 2011 report citing "fiscal constraints facing the federal government."  At the time of the announcement, the National Park Service required an estimated $9.5B backlog in unfulfilled repair and improvement projects.

Reports
At the outset of the initiative, an initial research report detailing possible initiatives was delivered.  Annual progress reports were delivered in 2011 and 2012, with no subsequent reports.

See also
 Environmentalism
 Environmental policy of the United States

References

External links
 America's Great Outdoors (AGO) Initiative, official website, US Department of the Interior.
 Obama Administration AGO Initiative page

United States Department of the Interior
Environmental policy in the United States
Obama administration initiatives
2010 establishments in the United States